Ray Millard Gidney (January 17, 1887 – October 21, 1978) was a United States Comptroller of the Currency from 1953 to 1961.

Ray M. Gidney was named Comptroller by President Dwight D. Eisenhower after a long and distinguished career in banking. He served as president of the Federal Reserve Bank of Cleveland prior to his appointment from 1944 to 1953

Gidney was known for the quiet and competent manner in which he ran the Office of the Comptroller of the Currency. He resigned to accept a position with a large bank in Jacksonville, Florida.

References

External links
 Statements and Speeches of Ray M. Gidney from 1947 to 1952.
 A collection of works by Ray Gidney

1887 births
1978 deaths
Comptrollers in the United States
United States Comptrollers of the Currency
Federal Reserve Bank of Cleveland presidents
Chairs of the Federal Deposit Insurance Corporation
Eisenhower administration personnel
Kennedy administration personnel